"Can't Stay Young Forever" is a single by Irish recording artist Bressie released in 2011. It is the first single taken from the album "Colourblind Stereo".
The song reached number nine on the Irish Singles Chart and received significant airplay on Irish radio.

Chart positions

References

External links
Music Video

2011 singles